The 2001–02 season was the 56th season in Rijeka's history. It was their 11th season in the Prva HNL and 28th successive top tier season.

Competitions

Prva HNL

Classification

Results summary

Results by round

Matches

Prva HNL

Source: HRnogomet.com

Croatian Cup

Source: HRnogomet.com

Squad statistics
Competitive matches only.  Appearances in brackets indicate numbers of times the player came on as a substitute.

See also
2001–02 Prva HNL
2001–02 Croatian Cup

References

External sources
 2001–02 Prva HNL at HRnogomet.com
 2001–02 Croatian Cup at HRnogomet.com 
 Prvenstvo 2001.-2002. at nk-rijeka.hr

HNK Rijeka seasons
Rijeka